The Supreme Court of Queensland is the highest court in the Australian State of Queensland. It was formerly the Brisbane Supreme Court, in the colony of Queensland.

The original jurisdiction of the Supreme Court allows its trial division to hear civil matters involving claims of more than 750,000; criminal matters involving serious offences (including murder and manslaughter); and matters arising under the Corporations Act 2001 (Cth) and cross-vesting legislation. A jury decides whether the defendant is guilty or not guilty. The division also hears all civil matters involving amounts of more than 750,000. A jury may decide these disputes.

The appellate jurisdiction of the Supreme Court allows its Court of Appeal to hear cases on appeal from the District Court, the trial division of the Supreme Court, and a number of other judicial tribunals in Queensland. Decisions made by the Supreme Court may be taken on appeal to the High Court of Australia in Canberra only by a grant of special leave of the High Court of Australia.

History
The Supreme Court of Queensland was founded on 7 August 1861, with the assent of the Supreme Court Constitution Amendment Act 1861 (Qld). Two subsequent pieces of legislation, including the Additional Judge Act 1862 (Qld) and the Supreme Court Act 1863 (Qld), were also necessary to establish the court's operating system.

Prior to separation of Queensland from New South Wales, the former naval officer, Captain John Clements Wickham, tried minor crimes in the Moreton Bay District. More serious cases were tried at the Supreme Court of New South Wales in Sydney. Two years before separation from New South Wales, the Moreton Bay Supreme Court Act 1857 (NSW) established the jurisdiction of the Supreme Court of New South Wales in the Moreton Bay District and Samuel Milford served as Judge. Milford resigned in February 1859, and was replaced by Alfred Lutwyche.Initially, the Brisbane Supreme Court served as the Supreme Court for all of Queensland. As the colony's population grew, two other courts were constructed. The first sittings of the Northern Supreme Court were held at Bowen in 1874 and the Bowen Court House was built in 1880 in classical revival style. The Central Supreme Court was officially opened at Rockhampton in 1896. After the opening of the Central Supreme Court at Rockhampton, the Northern Supreme Court moved from Bowen to Townsville. Justice Virgil Power, who served as the first Judge of the Central Supreme Court, was the first Queensland-born Supreme Court Judge. As the population of Queensland has grown, additional courts have been built at locations such as Bundaberg, Mackay, Cairns, Longreach, Maryborough, Roma and Townsville.

Although the Brisbane Supreme Court initially served the needs of the entire colony of Queensland, it did not occupy a purpose-built building until 1879. Until then, the Brisbane Court sat at the Old Convict Barracks in Queen Street. These barracks were in disrepair and a number of improvements, including new sets of windows, had to be constructed to allow the continued sitting of the Court. Furthermore, on Sundays, the area of the barracks used by the Court was also used as a church. Although the Court's surroundings were not elaborate, Parliament did provide an annual grant towards the establishment of a Supreme Court Library from 1861 to 1879.

By 1870, despite minor building modifications to the convict barracks, it had become clear that a new building was required to house the Brisbane Supreme Court. A site on George Street was selected and the prominent colonial architect, Francis Drummond Greville Stanley, submitted plans for an elaborate neoclassical building which was two storeys tall. These original plans featured stone floors and other sophisticated detail. They were later modified for financial reasons and in 1875 John Petrie successfully tendered to construct the building.

On 6 March 1879, the new Supreme Court opened. The entrance on the North Quay frontage had been designed as the main entrance but this was soon superseded by the George Street entrance. In 1880, iron gates were also added to the building. In 1931, the Queensland Public Works Department provided funds for the renovation of the interior of the Brisbane Supreme Court.

On the night of 2 September 1968, the building that housed the Brisbane Supreme Court was damaged by arson. It was subsequently demolished, and in 1976, it was replaced with a building designed by Bligh Jessup Bretnall and was opened by Queensland Governor Sir James Ramsay on 3 September 1981.
 

In 1989, Justice Angelo Vasta was removed from the court by Queensland Governor on the request of the Parliament.  This was the first time since federation that any state had used that method to remove a sitting judge from a Supreme Court.  Vasta was found to be not "a fit and proper person to continue in office" after giving false evidence to an investigation related to the Fitzgerald Inquiry.

In 2008, a  building program began to create a new Brisbane Supreme Court and District Court building, designed by Architectus Brisbane, led by Prof John Hockings. The building is known as the Queen Elizabeth II Courts of Law and was officially opened on Friday 3 August 2012 by Queensland Governor Penelope Wensley. It incorporates a public plaza and links to the existing Brisbane Magistrates Court building. The precinct occupies an entire city block between George, Roma and Turbot streets.

Composition

In 1991 the Queensland Supreme Court was restructured into two divisions, the Trial Division and the Court of Appeal. The Court is headed by the Chief Justice of Queensland (currently Chief Justice Helen Bowskill) who sits in both the Trial Division and the Court of Appeal.

The Court of Appeal comprises the President (currently President Debra Mullins) and four Judges of Appeal, who sit only in the Court of Appeal. Proceedings in the Court of Appeal are usually heard by three judges. The Trial Division comprises a number of trial judges, and is headed by the Senior Judge Administrator (currently Justice Ann Lyons). Proceedings in the Trial Division are heard by one trial judge. Most trial division judges also rotate through the Court of Appeal, usually for three week periods.

Appeals from:

 the Trial Division are heard by the Court of Appeal; and
 the Court of Appeal is heard by the High Court of Australia.

The Court of Appeal also hears appeals from the District Court of Queensland.

Judges of the Court  are:

Noted former judges
 The Honourable Paul de Jersey AC, who later became Chief Justice of Queensland and Governor of Queensland
 Catherine Holmes AC, first female Chief Justice of Queensland.
 Sir James Blair, who later became Chief Justice of Queensland, lieutenant-governor of Queensland, Knight Commander of the Order of St Michael and St George (KCMG)
 Sir Walter Campbell, who later became Governor of Queensland
 Sir James Cockle, the first Chief Justice of Queensland
 Peter Connolly
 Edward Archibald Douglas, son of Queensland Premier, John Douglas
 Robert Johnstone Douglas, son of Queensland Premier, John Douglas 
 Sir Harry Gibbs, who later became Chief Justice of Australia
 Sir Samuel Griffith, who later became the first Chief Justice of Australia
 Alfred Lutwyche, first judge
 Thomas McCawley
 Sir Edward Williams
 Sir William Webb, later appointed to the High Court of Australia and served as President of the International Military Tribunal for the Far East

Facilities
The Supreme Court sits mainly in the Queen Elizabeth II Courts of Law in Brisbane, which also houses the District Court. The court began operating out of this facility on 27 August 2012, prior to which it was located in the Law Courts Complex.

The court also has judges permanently appointed to sit in Rockhampton, Townsville and Cairns, and regularly sits in other regional districts.

See also

 Australian court hierarchy
 Judiciary of Australia
 List of Queensland courts and tribunals
 List of Judges of the Supreme Court of Queensland
UCPR QLD

References

Citations

Sources 
 
 Turner, Clive 2004, Australian Commercial Law, 25th edn, Lawbook Co., Sydney.

Attribution 
  This Wikipedia article incorporates text from "150 years of the Supreme Court of Queensland" by Dr Shirleene Robinson published by the State of Queensland under CC-BY 3.0 AU licence (accessed on 11 November 2014, archived on 11 November 2014).

External links
 Moreton Bay Supreme Court Act 1857
 Supreme Court Constitution Amendment Act 1861
 Additional Judge Act 1862
 Supreme Court Act 1863

 
1861 establishments in Australia
Articles incorporating text from the Queensland Government
Courts and tribunals established in 1861